Summerfield may refer to:

Places

United Kingdom
Summerfield, West Midlands, a district of Birmingham
Summerfield Research Station, a munitions production site near Kidderminster, Worcestershire

United States
Summerfield, Alabama
Summerfield, Florida
Summerfield, Illinois
Summerfield, Kansas
Summerfield, Louisiana
Summerfield, Maryland
Summerfield, Missouri
Summerfield, North Carolina
Summerfield, Ohio
Summerfield, Texas
Summerfield Township, Clare County, Michigan
Summerfield Township, Monroe County, Michigan
New Summerfield, Texas

Canada
Summerfield, Prince Edward Island

Other uses
Summerfield (surname)
Summerfield (film)
Summer Fields School in Oxford, England, which at one time was called "Summerfield"
Summerfield Schools, a school district in Michigan
Summerfield School (disambiguation)
Summerfield United Methodist Church in downtown Milwaukee, Wisconsin
Summerfield Suites, a chain of hotels

See also
Somerfield (disambiguation)
Summerville (disambiguation)